Thornhill Community Academy is a coeducational secondary school with academy status situated just outside Dewsbury, West Yorkshire, England.

The school is on the western side of Kirklees (Huddersfield) and near the M1 and the M62 motorways. It serves both the urban and rural areas of Dewsbury and draws from the villages of Thornhill, Thornhill Lees and Savile Town. The series Educating Yorkshire was filmed in the school.

Thornhill Community Academy was formerly the Community Science College at Thornhill, and Thornhill High School.

Site
A major building programme began in May 2002, with an investment of £4.2 million under the Public Private Partnership Initiative.  This work involved a complete upgrade of all college buildings including new areas in Design Technology, Creative and Expressive Arts, Humanities and a new Learning Resource Centre. A sports hall and muga has been built which is open to pupils and the public. Each department has its own designated specialist teaching area. There is a music suite, a dance and drama studio, six science laboratories and a science resource centre, two art studios, an area for modern foreign languages with study room, a sports hall, gym, P.E. classroom, tennis courts, playing fields and an isolation room.

Curriculum
The school follows the National Curriculum to GCSE level, with some subjects compulsory, and others as options. Some pupils study English Literature and Statistics following primary GCSE courses. Pupils taking each science as a separate subject, study for three GCSEs, one each for Physics, Chemistry and Biology. Triple science is offered to some pupils where the Double Award or Science Nationals is offered to others. During the first three years Food Technology, Graphics, Resistant Materials and Textiles and French or Urdu are taught, with pupils choosing one of these to continue at GCSE level later.

Educating Yorkshire
In January and February 2013 cameras were placed in the school for the filming of the Channel 4 series Educating Yorkshire. The series started on 5 September 2013. The show later won the National Television Awards for best Non-scripted Reality series. The award was claimed by Headteacher Mr Mitchell, Deputy Head Mr Burton, Assistant Head Mr Burton and former student Musharaf.

References

External links
Thornhill Community Academy official website

Schools in Dewsbury
Secondary schools in Kirklees
Academies in Kirklees